The tropical vlei rat (Otomys tropicalis) is a species of rodent in the family Muridae.
It is found in Burundi, Democratic Republic of the Congo, Kenya, Rwanda, South Sudan, and Uganda.
Its natural habitats are subtropical or tropical seasonally wet or flooded lowland grassland, subtropical or tropical high-altitude grassland, swamps, and plantations.

References

Otomys
Rodents of Africa
Mammals described in 1902
Taxa named by Oldfield Thomas
Taxonomy articles created by Polbot